Florence Mary Naylor (born 2 April 1926) is a British-American retired variety entertainer, known for her work as a West End leading lady, radio and television celebrity, singer, pianist, and accordionist.  She starred in the opening production number for the 1946 Royal Variety Performance, and was a child star in the Youth Takes A Bow troupe that toured England, Wales and Scotland during the first two years of World War II with Ernie Wise and Eric Morecambe.

Early life 
Florence Mary Naylor was born in Carlton, Nottingham, England to Cyril Naylor and Hannah Naylor (née Robinson), both of Nottingham. Mary started singing on an orange crate to attract customers while her parents sold fruit and vegetables in the open markets across the Midlands. She attended Standhill Infant School for five years, then graduated from Porchester Senior School, with a great portion of her education on the road while on tour. Mary started piano lessons on her 7th birthday, and accordion on her 9th. By age 11, Mary was awarded the gold medal Senior Grade Piano Examination, meaning that if she chose, she could be licensed to be a piano teacher herself. Between the ages of ten and twelve, Mary, her younger sister and brother, Margaret and Ernest, starred in Nottingham's Madame Haine's Accordion Band,." Mary also became a popular solo act between movies at Nottingham's movie theaters and in dance halls with Ernie Lotinga and his orchestra, and at Nig-Nog Concert fundraising events.

Early professional career 
At the age of twelve, Mary was "discovered" by show runner and comedian, Ernie Lotinga, and he brought her to London for a three week run at the Hackney Empire in the show, "King of Polonia" in August/September 1938.

Then in early March 1939, Mary auditioned for orchestra leader/impresario, Jack Hylton as he was passing through Nottingham, and three days later, she was in London during a run of "Monday Night at Eight" as part of a segment called "Youth Takes a Bow" one week each at the Granada Theater Woolwich, the Empire Holburn, and Shephard's Bush Empire. During this stay in London, Mary also made her B.B.C. radio debut on March 13, 1939 on "Monday Night at Seven" (later the program changed its name to "Monday Night at Eight") with Jack Hylton's band, and also debuted on BBC Television on Wednesday, March 15, and then again played piano, accordion, and sang on Friday, March 17. This made her the first (and youngest) artist to be on television from the city of Nottingham, and the first performer to be on the BBC twice in one week. The first youth cast of the Youth Takes A Bow segment in "Monday Night at Seven" included Mary, the Henderson Twins, Dick Henderson, Jr, Ernie Wise, and the Acromites.

Mary then joined Sid Walker of "Band Waggon" fame on his "Mr. Walker Wants to Know" road show which toured the major Moss Empires theatres throughout England in March and April 1939, then on to other incarnations of different Walker-Hylton show tours.  

On July 3, 1939, Mary opened in the live theatrically stage show of the popular former radio show, “Band Waggon,"  at the London Palladium.  The run abruptly ended when Britain declared war on Germany on September 3, 1939[38].  Theaters in the United Kingdom all closed for two weeks, then, when they reopened, child performers were not allowed on the London stage.  During the fall of 1939 and early 1940, Mary continued her career singing on the occasional radio show (Home Service and Special Forces radio programs), for a chain of Midland cinema's, performed in the Midlands with Big Band Shows (like Billy Merrin and his Commanders),and at various wartime fundraisers.

By the first week of February, 1940, Mary again was touring with a newly revised version of the  “Youth Takes A Bow” group on the Moss Empire circuit, this time chaperoned by her father, Cyril “Pops” Naylor. Most times the show was under the banner, "Youth Takes A Bow" during 1940, and then ”Secrets of the BBC” during 1941 since most of the cast, including its young stars, were regular favorites on British radio.

Under the compère of Bryan Michie, the core company of “Youth Takes a Bow” included: singer/pianist/accordionist, Mary Naylor; light comedian-singer-dancer, Ernie Wise; “glum-faced” comedian Eric Bartholomew (later known as Eric Morecombe), contortionist-acrobat, Jean Bamforth, harmonica player, Arthur Tolcher, and "Little Tich" big-boot dancer, Dorothy Duval.

Other child performers who, at times joined this core company included: tap dancer, Stan Vassie; Finnish singer Helva Rintala; singer Vera Howe, Scottish boy-soprano, Tommy Thompson; whistling Welsh miner Eddie Gunter; mimic and comedian Frank Hines; impressionist Gee Jay; mimic Katherine Jackett; singer Vera Howe; boy soprano Edwin Lewis; musicians, the Mackenzie Twins, singer Margaret Malone, comedian Billy Watts; boy baritone, Harry Briscoe; young tenor Henry Hodson; soprano Millicent Phillips; Martin Lukens; singer Stanley Ambler; and Alan Cumberland.

The “Youth Takes A Bow” company worked almost every week from early 1940 onwards in all the major cities of England, Scotland, and Wales.  The destruction of London during the German Blitz bombings in mid-October, 1940 forced the troupe to perform mostly outside of London, but they returned again after the worst of the bombing stopped.. The children (ages 12–17) were told by management that if the bombs started to fall after the curtain had risen, they were to keep their acts going because it was safer at that point to have the audience stay in the theatre rather than risk flying debris outside.  They were bombed themselves, most notably in Swansea, South Wales, on September 1, 1940, and in Chatham on October 5, 1940. The troupe of youngsters was booked for 50-52 weeks per year, and they were rarely sent home for a week except when the theatre they were supposed to play at was bombed (such as in March 1941).In addition to doing 7-18 performances per week, Mary, and many of her child-star cast-mates performed on radio, in special concerts, for charity events, fund-raising causes (including the Million Cigarettes Scheme), for military gatherings, and even visited soldiers at camps and hospitals all over Great Britain. Mary, and the "Youth Takes a Bow" troupe, became a beloved part of the Entertainment industry during World War II.

The "Youth Takes A Bow" segment was usually positioned in the second act of the show, with the first act consisting of big name professionals like Alice and Rosie Lloyd, Adelaide Hall, Tessie O'Shea, June Marlow, The Danny Lipton Trio, Archie Glen, George Moon & Dick Bentley, Dickie "Large Lumps" Hassett, The Iizuka Brothers, The Donna Sisters, Archie Glen, Scott Saunders, and more.  Sometimes the first act went under the title of "Secrets of the BBC," since most of the entire bill, including Mary Naylor and most of the other kids, performed regularly on BBC radio. At other times, the YTAB troupe would be incorporated for a week here and there in Jack Warner's stage version of his famous wartime show, Garrison Theatre, filling in playing various parts.  At other times, the YTAB troupe completed the bill with big bands like Nat Gonella & his New Georgians.

In April 1942, just after her 16th birthday, Mary left the “Youth Takes A Bow” company, for the breakout ingénue role in “Scoop” at the London’s West End Vaudeville Theatre.  In September of that year, she left the cast of “Scoop” to play the part of Vera Hasset in the film, "The Man in Grey" with Margaret Lockwood, James Mason, and Stewart Granger.  After the movie, Mary returned to the stage starring in George Black's “Best Bib and Tucker” at the London Palladium with Tommy Trinder. During the run of this show, Mary became involved with the Merchant Seamen's Fund and the Merchant Radio program, “Shipmates Ashore,” making weekly contributions throughout the remainder of the war, partly because her old co-star, Ernie Wise, had come off the stage and was now in the Merchant Navy.  Mary’s work with this branch of the services garnered her the title, “Sweetheart of the Merchant Navy.”  While Mary was in "Best Bib and Tucker" at the London Palladium, she would pay weekly visits to Grinstead Hospital for Burned Airmen to meet with "the boys" individually and sing for them in her RAF-style show costume. At the time, she was 16/17, about the same age as the youngest men.  Mary was then voted a "Pin-Up Girl of the RAF."  Throughout all the war years, Mary volunteered at fund raising events, lending her talents to help the troupes and all the people of Great Britain.

After “Best Bib and Tucker” ended its 10-month long run at the Palladium Theatre, the play continued as a road show (now called: "Palladium Comes to Camp") playing on stages and military bases on and off until the end of 1943 under the auspices of the General War Theatre Council. From that point on, Ms. Naylor was featured in variety shows, reviews, radio, cabaret, charity events, and concerts in London and every major British city, returning to various Panto shows each holiday season.  In November 1946, she was the opening act for the first Royal Command Variety Performance at the Palladium, singing "Turn Off The Rain."  Her performance earned her the nickname from the Queen (later called the "Queen Mother") as "The Typical England's Rose."

Adult career 
After the war, Mary was a top-of-the-bill singing star, with a busy career on stage and on radio. She also had a long, rewarding double act with popular crooner, Sam Browne, and a successful solo career.

Continuing after the end of the war until 1962, Mary worked as a leading lady on stage in Variety, West End theatres, Stoll Theatres, the Moss Empires Theatres shows, charity events, reviews, in ice shows (such as "Champagne on Ice"), cabaret,  in Panto, and as a brand spokesperson. From 1938 onwards, Mary had a long, almost weekly presence on the radio in Great Britain. She had her own 15-minute television show, guest starred on many other television shows. Though Mary had a good amount of success on television, she never found the right vehicle to create her own show in Great Britain.  In the late 1950's she expanded to doing variety and special performances in the United States, including "A Maid in America," and shows in Las Vegas.

Mary also did numerous radio shows with Ernie Wise and Eric Morcombe on the BBC in the late 1940's and 1950's.  She and Ralph Reader starred in a radio show called "It's Great To Be Young," 1948-1949. She starred in the BBC Television show, "I'm a Friend of Mary's," in 1950-51. Mary headlined her own Sunday night fortnight television variety show in 1958, produced by Barry Lupino.

Starting in 1942, and continuing after the war, Mary spent a lot of her spare time entertaining the forces at the "Stage Door Canteen" in London.  She was one of the performers invited to be onstage for the last show of the SDC when it closed its doors in 1947.  Mary Naylor also entertained the British troops in Germany as part of the ENSA, the Entertainers National Service Association, for ten weeks in the early 1950's as part of "The Best of Variety" show.

Since 1947, Mary has been an active member of The Grand Order of Lady Ratlings, the female arm of the variety entertainers club.

Associated acts
Sam Browne, Ernie Wise, Eric Morecambe, Tessie O'Shea, Dickie Henderson, Adelaide Hall, Tommy Trinder, George Black, Jack Hylton, Arthur Askey, Celia Lipton Lew Grade, Syd Walker, and Bryan Michie.

Personal life 
Mary Naylor married bird-manipulator magician, Jack Kodell on Saturday, March 7, 1953 at London’s Caxton Hall Registry Office, Westminster. Tessie O’Shea, the headliner from many of Mary’s shows during her “Youth Takes A Bow” days, served as Matron of Honor.  Mary Naylor and her husband, Jack Kodell (often just billed as "Kodell") worked together onstage in Great Britain, Germany, and the United States. Mary and Jack emigrated for good to Kodell’s native America in 1960, where they pioneered taking the idol trans-Atlantic ships and turning them into "floating Holiday Camps" by arranging for full-scale entertainment shows aboard ships for the first time (thus making them into "Cruise Ships.")  After they retired, Mary and Jack moved to Orlando, Florida, where they were involved in mentoring the next generations of magicians and entertainers. They had no children. Jack died in 2012, and Mary Naylor Kodell continues to counsel talent.

Selected shows
"King of Polonia" (1938) Empire, Hackney, London; "Monday Night at Seven" (1939) London, various theatres;  "Mr. Walker Wants To Know (1939) Touring Show; "Youth Takes a Bow" (1939-1942) Touring Show; "Band Waggon" (1939) London Palladium; "Scoop" (1942) London Palladium;   "Best Bib and Tucker (1942-43) London Palladium;   "Goldilocks and the Three Bears" (1943) Edinburgh, Scotland; "On With The Show" (1944) North Pier Theatre, Blackpool; "Jewel & Warriss with Mary Naylor" (1944) Blackpool Palace, Blackpool; "Strike a New Note" (1943) Prince of Wales Theatre, West End; "Dick Wittingham" (1943) Aston Hippodrome, Birmingham; "On with the Show" (1944) North Pier, Blackpool; "Hip, Hip Hooray (1945) New Opera House, Blackpool, then Tour;  "Humpty Dumpty" (1945) Palace Theatre, Manchester; Moss Empires variety tour with Sam Browne (1946 -1956);  Royal Variety Performance (1946 - opening act), London Palladium; "Out of the Blue" (1947) Grand Theatre, Blackpool; "Turn On the Rainbow (1947), Empire, Liverpool; "Aladdin" (1947), New Theatre, Oxford; "Robinson Crusoe" (1948) Hippodrome, Preston; "Sam Browne and Mary Naylor Road Show" (1949) various; "Puss in Boots" (1950) Opera House, Belfast, Northern Ireland; "Puss in Boots" (1951) Empire, Leeds; "Goody Two Shoes" (1952) Royal, Hanley; "Champagne on Ice" (1953) Palladium, London; "Maid in America", Terrace Room at the Morrison Hotel, Chicago, IL USA and on tour (1956);  "Robin Hood" (1957–58) ; "Babes in the Wood" (1957) Hulme Hippodrome

References

British women singers
British actresses
1926 births
Living people
British emigrants to the United States